Triaenophorus is a genus of flatworms belonging to the family Triaenophoridae.

The species of this genus are found in Europe and Northern America.

Species:
 Triaenophorus crassus Forel, 1868 
 Triaenophorus lucii (Müller, 1776)

References

Platyhelminthes